Estadio Olímpico Ignacio Zaragoza (In English: Ignacio Zaragoza Olympic Stadium) is an Olympic stadium where professional football and baseball have been played. It is located in Puebla, Puebla, Mexico east of Mexico City). The stadium was built in 1952 and used by local professional baseball team Pericos de Puebla from 1952 to 1972. It was also used by Puebla FC from 1957 to 1968.

Notable events
In 1981, on October 17 and 18, British rock band Queen played for the Mexican audience. The first of two concerts was the most significant, because people broke a gate of the stadium, and there were many excesses because people had not seen an event like this before. People threw many objects to stage: shoes, batteries, food, etc. And a pantyhose filled with dust was thrown to the guitar player Brian May. At the end, Freddie Mercury said to the Mexican audience: "Thank you for the shoes..."

See also
Puebla FC
Pericos de Puebla

External links

 Estadio Zaragoza Location

1952 establishments in Mexico
American football venues in Mexico
Baseball venues in Mexico
Football venues in Mexico
Club Puebla
Sports venues completed in 1952
Sports venues in Puebla